The Embassy of Russia in Havana is the headquarters of the diplomatic mission of the Russian Federation in the Republic of Cuba. It is well known for its striking constructivist building in the Miramar district of the city, built by architect Aleksandr Rochegov. Some liken it to a sword, others to a syringe.

History
Construction began in December 1978 and was completed in November 1987. The embassy opened as the Soviet embassy, in an era when Soviet influence in Cuba was immense, and transitioned to its status as the Russian Embassy after the fall of the Soviet Union in 1991.

Ambassadors
 25 December 1991 – 6 May 2000: Arnold Kalinin
 27 June 2000 – 14 April 2008: Andrey Dmitriev
 14 April 2008 – present: Mikhail Kamynin

See also
 Cuba–Russia relations
 List of diplomatic missions of Russia

References

External links

Havana
Cuba–Soviet Union relations
Cuba–Russia relations
Russia
Constructivist architecture
Government buildings completed in 1987
20th-century architecture in Cuba